In enzymology, a L-methionine (S)-S-oxide reductase is an enzyme that catalyzes the chemical reaction

L-methionine + thioredoxin disulfide + H2O  L-methionine (S)-S-oxide + thioredoxin

The 3 substrates of this enzyme are L-methionine, thioredoxin disulfide, and H2O, whereas its two products are L-methionine (S)-S-oxide and thioredoxin.

This enzyme belongs to the family of oxidoreductases, specifically those acting on a sulfur group of donors with a disulfide as acceptor.  The systematic name of this enzyme class is L-methionine:thioredoxin-disulfide S-oxidoreductase. Other names in common use include fSMsr, methyl sulfoxide reductase I and II, acetylmethionine sulfoxide reductase, methionine sulfoxide reductase, L-methionine:oxidized-thioredoxin S-oxidoreductase, methionine-S-oxide reductase, and free-methionine (S)-S-oxide reductase.  This enzyme participates in methionine metabolism.

References

 
 
 
 

EC 1.8.4
Enzymes of unknown structure